Auburntown is a town in Cannon County, Tennessee, United States. The population was 269 at the 2010 census.

History

Once known as Poplar Stand, due to large population of poplar trees in the area, Auburntown was eventually renamed after Auburn, New York. It was incorporated in 1949.

Geography

Demographics

2020 census

As of the 2020 United States census, there were 272 people, 87 households, and 61 families residing in the town.

2000 census
As of the census of 2000, there were 252 people, 102 households, and 74 families residing in the town. The population density was 445.8 per square mile (170.7/km2). There were 115 housing units at an average density of 203.4 per square mile (77.9/km2). The racial makeup of the town was 98.41% White, 0.40% African American, 0.40% Asian, and 0.79% from two or more races.

There were 102 households, out of which 34.3% had children under the age of 18 living with them, 64.7% were married couples living together, 5.9% had a female householder with no husband present, and 26.5% were non-families. 26.5% of all households were made up of individuals, and 10.8% had someone living alone who was 65 years of age or older. The average household size was 2.47 and the average family size was 2.96.

In the town, the population was spread out, with 25.0% under the age of 18, 5.6% from 18 to 24, 28.2% from 25 to 44, 25.8% from 45 to 64, and 15.5% who were 65 years of age or older. The median age was 38 years. For every 100 females, there were 85.3 males. For every 100 females age 18 and over, there were 81.7 males.

The median income for a household in the town was $32,857, and the median income for a family was $38,750. Males had a median income of $31,429 versus $26,250 for females. The per capita income for the town was $17,275. About 8.1% of families and 11.0% of the population were below the poverty line, including 12.0% of those under the age of eighteen and 9.8% of those 65 or over.

References

External links
Town charter

Towns in Cannon County, Tennessee
Towns in Tennessee